This is the List of municipalities in Batman Province, Turkey .

References 

Geography of Batman Province
Batman